Le Rêve de l'horloger, sold in the United States as The Clockmaker's Dream and in Britain as The Dream of the Clock Maker, is a 1904 French short silent film by Georges Méliès. It was sold by Méliès's Star Film Company and is numbered 581–584 in its catalogues.

Méliès plays the clockmaker in the film, which uses substitution splices and dissolves for its special effects. Méliès reused the globe prop and park backdrop in The Wonderful Living Fan, made later the same year.

References

External links
 

French black-and-white films
Films directed by Georges Méliès
French silent short films
1900s French films